The Apostolic Vicariate (or Vicariate Apostolic) of Zamora en [i.e. in] Ecuador is a missionary circonscription of  the Roman Catholic Church.

Its cathedral see is located in the city of Zamora, in Ecuador's Amazonian Zamora-Chinchipe province. It is exempt, i.e. directly subject to the Holy See, not part of any ecclesiastical province.

History 
On 17 February 1893, Pope Leo XIII established the Vicariate Apostolic of Zamora from the Ecuadorian Apostolic Vicariate of Napo. 
 
Its name was changed slightly by Pope John Paul II to the Apostolic Vicariate of Zamora en Ecuador on 22 February 1991. This avoids confusion with other cities called Zamora, in Europe and the Americas (including bishoprics in Spain and Mexico).

Incumbent Ordinaries 
So far, all its apostolic vicars have been Franciscans (O.F.M. ).

 Jorge Francisco Mosquera Barreiro, O.F.M. †1990 (21 April 1964 – 10 Sep. 1982)
 Serafín Luis Alberto Cartagena Ocaña, O.F.M. (10 Sep. 1982 – 1 Feb. 2003)
 Fausto Trávez Trávez, O.F.M. (1 Feb. 2003 – 27 March 2008) Appointed, Bishop of Babahoyo
 Walter Jehowá Heras Segarra, O.F.M. (25 March 2009 – 31 Oct 2019) Appointed, Bishop of Loja

See also 
 Roman Catholicism in Ecuador

References 

Apostolic vicariates
Roman Catholic dioceses in Ecuador
Religious organizations established in 1893
1893 establishments in South America